The following table compares notable software frameworks, libraries and computer programs for deep learning.

Deep-learning software by name

Comparison of compatibility of machine learning models

See also
Comparison of numerical-analysis software
Comparison of statistical packages
List of datasets for machine-learning research
List of numerical-analysis software

References

Deep learning frameworks